Alinci may refer to:

Alinci, Mogila, a small village in North Macedonia
Alinci, Prilep, a village in the Municipality of Prilep, North Macedonia